The finescale razorbelly minnow (Salmostoma phulo) is a species of ray-finned fish in the genus Salmostoma. It is a species of freshwater fish native to Bangladesh and throughout India. It lives in the lower reaches of various bodies of water including rivers, canals, ponds, and ditches. With a maximum length of only , the fish is of little commercial or dietary value to humans.

References

Salmostoma
Fish described in 1822